Andrea Pegoraro (born 24 October 1966 in Camposampiero) is a former Italian pole vaulter.

Biography
Andrea Pegoraro participated at one edition of Summer Olympics (1992) and one of the World Championships in Athletics (1993). He has won 4 times the individual national championship.

Achievements

National titles
2 wins in the pole vault (1994, 1995) at the Italian Athletics Championships
2 wins in the pole vault (1990, 1993) at the Italian Athletics Indoor Championships

See also
 Italian all-time lists - Pole vault

References

External links
 

1966 births
Italian male pole vaulters
Living people
Athletics competitors of Centro Sportivo Carabinieri
Athletes (track and field) at the 1992 Summer Olympics
Olympic athletes of Italy
World Athletics Championships athletes for Italy